The Gokwe Formation is an Early Cretaceous geologic formation in Zimbabwe. Dinosaur remains are among the fossils that have been recovered from the formation, although none have yet been referred to a specific genus. Sediments of the formation may have been laid down in a small shallow lake, carried by intermittent floods from a land surface surrounding the lake on which aeolian transport of sand took place. More likely the animals died on a dry lake bed, and their bones were exposed to a period of desiccation, later floods would scatter the fragments and incorporate them in sediment.

See also 
 List of dinosaur-bearing rock formations
 List of stratigraphic units with indeterminate dinosaur fossils
 List of fossiliferous stratigraphic units in Zimbabwe
 Geology of Zimbabwe

References

Bibliography

Further reading 
 G. Bond and K. Bromley. 1970. Sediments with the remains of dinosaurs near Gokwe, Rhodesia. Palaeogeography, Palaeoclimatology, Palaeoecology 8:313-327

Geologic formations of Zimbabwe
Lower Cretaceous Series of Africa
Sandstone formations
Limestone formations
Lacustrine deposits
Paleontology in Zimbabwe
Geography of Midlands Province